The Musée des Automates (the Automatons Museum) in Lyon, France, was a museum with a collection of 250 automatic puppets, all of them moving and made in the building's workshop. Seven rooms and 20 animated scenes reflected the heritage and tradition of Lyon. The museum closed in March 2022.

See also 
 List of museums in France
 Musee de la Magie of Paris - there is also a Musee des Automates co-located with this museum

References

External links 
 Official site of the museum

5th arrondissement of Lyon
Culture in Lyon
Museums in Lyon